This article is about the particular significance of the year 1791 to Wales and its people.

Incumbents
Lord Lieutenant of Anglesey - Henry Paget 
Lord Lieutenant of Brecknockshire and Monmouthshire – Henry Somerset, 5th Duke of Beaufort
Lord Lieutenant of Caernarvonshire - Thomas Bulkeley, 7th Viscount Bulkeley
Lord Lieutenant of Cardiganshire – Wilmot Vaughan, 1st Earl of Lisburne
Lord Lieutenant of Carmarthenshire – John Vaughan  
Lord Lieutenant of Denbighshire - Richard Myddelton  
Lord Lieutenant of Flintshire - Sir Roger Mostyn, 5th Baronet 
Lord Lieutenant of Glamorgan – John Stuart, Lord Mountstuart
Lord Lieutenant of Merionethshire - Watkin Williams
Lord Lieutenant of Montgomeryshire – George Herbert, 2nd Earl of Powis
Lord Lieutenant of Pembrokeshire – Richard Philipps, 1st Baron Milford
Lord Lieutenant of Radnorshire – Thomas Harley (politician, born 1730) (from 8 April)
Bishop of Bangor – John Warren
Bishop of Llandaff – Richard Watson
Bishop of St Asaph – Lewis Bagot
Bishop of St Davids – Samuel Horsley

Events
June - William Jones distributes copies of an address at the Llanrwst eisteddfod, titled To all Indigenous Cambro-Britons, calling on poor Welsh farmers to set up a colony in the United States.
Richard Phillips builds Clyne Castle.
Peter Williams is excommunicated by the Methodists for publishing Sabellian heresy.
Probable date of completion of Methodist chapel at Earlswood, Monmouthshire.
Thomas Jones becomes High Sheriff of Radnorshire.

Arts and literature

New books
Joshua Thomas - New translation of the Baptist "Confession of Faith" issued by the London Assembly of 1689 
John Williams - An enquiry into the truth of the tradition concerning the discovery of America by Prince Madog ab Owen Gwynedd, about the year 1170 
Peter Williams - Llythyr at Hen Gydymaith

Births
23 February - Sir John Cowell-Stepney, baronet, landowner and politician (d. 1877)
5 December - William Henry Yelverton, MP for Carmarthen Boroughs 1832–1835 (d. 1884)
date unknown
Robert Everett, Independent minister and writer (d. 1875)
Thomas Fothergill, ironmaster (d. 1858)

Deaths
11 January - William Williams (Pantycelyn), poet and hymn-writer, 73
13 February - William Parry, artist, 48
19 April - Richard Price, philosopher, 68
17 September - David Morris (hymn writer), 47

References

Wales
Wales